Ipswich Town Football Club Women is a women's team affiliated with Ipswich Town Football Club. They currently compete in the FA Women's Premier League South, the third tier of women's football in the country. They play their home games at the AGL Arena in Felixstowe, the home of Felixstowe & Walton United.

First-team squad

Academy squad

Coaching staff

References

External links
Official website

Ipswich Town F.C.
Women's football clubs in England